Tropheops modestus is a species of cichlid endemic to Lake Malawi.

This species can reach a length of  SL.

References

modestus
Fish of Lake Malawi
Cichlid fish of Africa
Fish described in 1974
Taxonomy articles created by Polbot